Osterc is a Slovenian surname that may refer to
Aljaž Osterc (born 1999), Slovenian ski jumper
Lidija Osterc (1928–2006), Slovenian painter and illustrator
Milan Osterc (born 1975), Slovenian football striker 
Slavko Osterc (1895–1941), Slovenian composer 
Slavko Osterc Ensemble, a Slovenian chamber orchestra formed in 1962 

Slovene-language surnames